Maria Liktoras (born 20 February 1975) is a former female Polish volleyball player, a member of Poland women's national volleyball team in 2003–2008, a participant of the Olympic Games Beijing 2008, European Champion 2003, five-time Polish Champion (1999, 2000, 2001, 2002, 2005).

Personal life
She was born in Mineralnye Vody and grew up in Odessa. In April 2009 she gave birth to a son.

Career

National team
On 28 September 2003 Poland women's national volleyball team, including Liktoras, beat Turkey (3–0) in final and won title of European Champion 2003.

Sporting achievements

National team
 2003  CEV European Championship

References

External links
 FIVB Profile

1975 births
Living people
People from Mineralnye Vody
Naturalized citizens of Poland
Russian emigrants to Poland
Polish women's volleyball players
Olympic volleyball players of Poland
Volleyball players at the 2008 Summer Olympics